Chitumbo Mwali (born 1986) is a Zambian chess player. He was awarded the tile of International Master in 2007.

Chess career
He won the African Junior Chess Championship in 2006, and earned the silver medal on board four in the 2007 All-Africa Games.

After winning the Zambian Chess World Cup Qualifier in 2021, he qualified to play in the Chess World Cup 2021. Pre-tournament favourite Andrew Kayonde, trailing by 1.5 points with two rounds to go and a game in hand against IM Chitumbo Mwali, pulled out after accusing the other 5 players of  colluding to deliberately lose against Mwali.

In the first round at the World Cup, Chitumbo lost the first game against the much higher-rated Haik M. Martirosyan before winning the second game to take the encounter to tiebreaks, where he was defeated 2-0 in the rapid games.

He is also an accountant and chess coach.

References

External links 

Chitumbo Mwali chess games at 365Chess.com

1986 births
Living people
Zambian chess players
Competitors at the 2007 All-Africa Games
African Games silver medalists for Zambia
African Games medalists in chess